Methley South railway station was one of three stations that served the village of Methley, West Yorkshire, England.

The station was built by the Methley Joint Railway, a line in which the Lancashire and Yorkshire Railway, the GNR and the NER were shareholders.
The station, opened on 1 May 1869, known as Methley Joint station, renamed to Methley South and was closed on 7 March 1960.

See also
Methley railway station
Methley Junction railway station

References

External links

 Methley South station (shown open) on navigable 1947 O. S. map

Disused railway stations in Leeds
Former Methley Joint Railway stations
Railway stations in Great Britain opened in 1869
Railway stations in Great Britain closed in 1960
1869 establishments in England
Rothwell, West Yorkshire